Boundary Stream Mainland Island is a mainland island in the Hawke's Bay Region of New Zealand.

It is managed by the Department of Conservation.

The park includes the Hawke's Bay Region's highest waterfall and several walks, including walks suitable for children.

See also
 Mainland islands

References

Protected areas of the Hawke's Bay Region